The 1996 New York Jets season was the franchise's 27th season in the National Football League (NFL) and the 37th overall. They failed to improve upon its league-worst 3–13 record from 1995 as they finished 1–15, which is the worst record in franchise history. As a result, head coach Rich Kotite stepped down before the season ended with a record of 1–15.

The Jets tied an NFL record that the New Orleans Saints set in 1980 and became the fifth team and first since the 1991 Indianapolis Colts to finish a season with fifteen losses. The record would be equaled by the 2000 San Diego Chargers, 2001 Carolina Panthers, and the 2007 Miami Dolphins before the 2008 Detroit Lions eclipsed it by becoming the first team to go through a sixteen-game season without a single victory.

Offseason 
After three seasons with quarterback Boomer Esiason as the starter, the Jets decided to go in a different direction and released Esiason in the offseason. They signed Neil O'Donnell, who had just led the Pittsburgh Steelers to the Super Bowl, to replace him in the hopes he would duplicate his success with the Steelers. The Jets received the first pick in the NFL draft in April and drafted wide receiver Keyshawn Johnson out of the University of Southern California. The Jets also signed offensive tackles Jumbo Elliott and David Williams and receivers Jeff Graham and Webster Slaughter. The Jets spent $70 million in the offseason on free-agent and rookie contracts.

NFL draft

Personnel

Staff/coaches

Roster

Season 
O'Donnell was the starter for the first six games of the season, but they went 0–6 under him. He suffered a season-ending shoulder injury during pregame warmups before the seventh game. Longtime Buffalo Bills backup quarterback Frank Reich replaced him, but he didn't fare much better. They lost to Jacksonville and Buffalo, before the now lowly 0–8 Jets beat former Jets QB Boomer Esiason and his new team, the Arizona Cardinals (although Esiason didn't play for Arizona in that game), at Sun Devil Stadium for what would become their only win of the season in their first game against the Cardinals since 1978. Kotite announced his resignation on December 20.

Schedule

Game summaries

Week 6: vs. Oakland Raiders

Week 9: at Arizona Cardinals

The 0-8 Jets were desperately looking for their first win of the season as they faced the Cardinals in Arizona. In the first quarter, Nick Lowery opened the score for the Jets with a 37-yard field goal. By the second quarter, the Jets powered through with two touchdowns from Keyshawn Johnson and Richie Anderson. However, by the third quarter, the Cardinals scored two touchdowns of their own, cutting the Jets' lead to three. Fortunately, in the fourth quarter, the Jets scored two more touchdowns, en route to their first victory of the season as they defeated the Cardinals 31-21.

Standings

External links 
 1996 statistics

New York Jets seasons
New York Jets
New York Jets season
20th century in East Rutherford, New Jersey
Meadowlands Sports Complex